Kamal Ziani (born 20 February 1972) is a retired Spanish long-distance runner who specialized in the marathon.

He finished seventh at the 2002 European Championships. He also competed at the 2006 European Championships and the World Championships in 2001 and 2005.

Achievements
All results regarding marathon, unless stated otherwise

Personal bests
5000 metres - 13:59.88 min (1998)
Half marathon - 1:02:56 hrs (2000)
Marathon - 2:10:18 hrs (1996)

References

Marathon Profile

1972 births
Living people
Spanish male long-distance runners
Spanish sportspeople of Moroccan descent
Spanish male marathon runners